Uroš Celcer (born 7 April 1989) is a Slovenian professional footballer who plays for NK Brda as a defender.

Club career
Celcer and Alen Jogan were signed by Parma in June 2013, with Solomon Enow moved to Gorica for €1 million. On 1 July 2013, Celcer and Jogan returned to Gorica in temporary deals. In summer 2014 Celcer left for Scottish club Ross County. He was released in November 2014.

In summer 2015, Celcer and Jogan were re-signed by Gorica on two-year contracts.

References

External links
NZS profile 

1989 births
Living people
Slovenian footballers
Slovenia youth international footballers
Association football fullbacks
Slovenian PrvaLiga players
Slovenian Second League players
Scottish Professional Football League players
NK Maribor players
NK Bela Krajina players
ND Gorica players
Parma Calcio 1913 players
Ross County F.C. players
NK Brda players
Slovenian expatriate footballers
Slovenian expatriate sportspeople in Italy
Expatriate footballers in Italy
Slovenian expatriate sportspeople in Scotland
Expatriate footballers in Scotland